AD 22 (XXII) was a common year starting on Thursday (link will display the full calendar) of the Julian calendar. At the time, it was known as the Year of the Consulship of Agrippa and Galba (or, less frequently, year 775 Ab urbe condita). The denomination AD 22 for this year has been used since the early medieval period, when the Anno Domini calendar era became the prevalent method in Europe for naming years.

Events

By place

Roman Empire 
 Drusus Julius Caesar receives the tribunicia potestas (tribunician power).

Births 
 Valeria Messalina, third wife of Emperor Claudius (d. 48 AD)

Deaths 
 Daeso, emperor of Dongbuyeo (b. 60 BC)
 Gaius Ateius Capito, Roman jurist and suffect consul (b. c. 30 BC)
 Junia Tertia, wife of Gaius Cassius Longinus (b. c. 75 BC)

References 

0022

als:20er#22